Teri Montefusco (born June 18, 1941) is an American gymnast. She competed in six events at the 1960 Summer Olympics.

References

External links
 

1941 births
Living people
American female artistic gymnasts
Olympic gymnasts of the United States
Gymnasts at the 1960 Summer Olympics
Sportspeople from Peoria, Illinois
Pan American Games gold medalists for the United States
Pan American Games silver medalists for the United States
Pan American Games medalists in gymnastics
Medalists at the 1959 Pan American Games
Gymnasts at the 1959 Pan American Games